Kovvada is a village in West Godavari district in the state of Andhra Pradesh in India.

Demographics
 India census, Kovvada has a population of 2861 of which 1395 are males while 1466 are females. The average sex ratio of Kovvada village is 1051. The child population is 322, which makes up 11.25% of the total population of the village, with sex ratio 952. In 2011, the literacy rate of Kovvada village was 70.26% when compared to 67.02% of Andhra Pradesh.

See also 
 Kovvada Atomic Power Project
 Eluru

References 

Villages in West Godavari district